Rotuma Airport  is an airport serving the island of Rotuma in Fiji. It is located near Else'e, a village in the district of Malhaha. It is operated by Airports Fiji Limited. An upgrade which saw Rotuma Airport's runway sealed was opened in 2018 to allow flights on larger ATR 72-600 aircraft operated by Fiji Link replacing the smaller de Havilland Twin Otter aircraft on its service to Nadi International Airport.

Facilities

Airlines and destinations

References

External links
 
 

Airports in Fiji
Rotuma